is a town located in Nita District, Shimane Prefecture, Japan.

It was formed on March 31, 2005 from the merger of the towns of Nita and Yokota.

As of March 1, 2017, the town has a population of 12,655 and a density of 34 persons per km². The area is 368.06 km².

History
The town of Okuizumo was one of the early centers of Tatara iron making method and remains the only modern site of it, producing a steel for the traditional Japanese swords.

Nearby Komaki mine was used to produce tungsten from 1911 to 1984.

Geography

Climate
Okuizumo has a humid subtropical climate (Köppen climate classification Cfa) with very warm summers and cool winters. Precipitation is abundant throughout the year.

Demographics
Per Japanese census data, the population of Okuizumo in 2020 is 11,849 people. Okuizumo has been conducting censuses since 1920.

References

External links

Okuizumo official website 

Towns in Shimane Prefecture